Jack Cairnes (born April 2, 1943) is an American politician who served as a member of the Washington House of Representatives, representing the 47th district from 1995 to 2005. A member of the Republican Party, he was defeated by Democrat Pat Sullivan in 2004.

Personal life 
Cairnes' wife is Andrea Cairnes. They have four children. Cairnes and his family live in Covington, Washington.

References

External links 
 Jack Cairnes at ourcampaigns.com

Living people
1948 births
Republican Party members of the Washington House of Representatives
20th-century American politicians
21st-century American politicians
Cameron University alumni
Ball State University alumni